= Chennampatti =

Village in Madurai district, Tamil Nadu, India

Coordinates: 9.682074°N 78.012359°E

Chennampatti is a village in Madurai district, Tamil Nadu, India.
